Eric Russell may refer to:

Eric Frank Russell (1905–1978), British writer
Eric Russell (cricketer) (born 1936), Scottish English cricketer 
Eric Russell (athlete) (born 1944), Australian athlete

See also
Erick Russell, American politician